The 1998 Tour de la Région Wallonne was the 25th edition of the Tour de Wallonie cycle race and was held on 1 August to 5 August 1998. The race started in Liège and finished in Houffalize. The race was won by Frank Vandenbroucke.

General classification

References

Tour de Wallonie
Tour de la Région Wallonne